Aquatics at the 1979 Southeast Asian Games included swimming, diving and water polo events. The three sports of aquatics were held at Senayan Aquatic Sport Complex, Jakarta, Indonesia. Aquatics events was held between 24 September to 27 September.

Medal winners

Swimming
Men's events

Women's events

Diving

Water polo

References

1979
1979 Southeast Asian Games